Vaja Uzakov (born 4 June 1988) is an Uzbek tennis player.

Uzakov has a career high ATP singles ranking of 698 achieved on 7 June 2010. He also has a career high ATP doubles ranking of 316, achieved on 11 August 2008.
 
Uzakov has represented Uzbekistan at Davis Cup, where he has a win–loss record of 0–6.

He played at the 2010 Asian Games on singles he lost from the late champion Somdev Devvarman at the 3rd round. On mixed doubles with Nigina Abduraimova lost on 1st round. On the men's team event won the silver medal with Farrukh Dustov, Murad Inoyatov and Denis Istomin.

Future and Challenger finals

Singles: 1 (0–1)

Doubles 9 (3–6)

Davis Cup

Participations: (0–6)

   indicates the outcome of the Davis Cup match followed by the score, date, place of event, the zonal classification and its phase, and the court surface.

References

External links 
 
 
 
 

1988 births
Living people
Uzbekistani male tennis players
Olympic tennis players of Uzbekistan
Tennis players at the 2010 Asian Games
Asian Games silver medalists for Uzbekistan
Medalists at the 2010 Asian Games
Asian Games medalists in tennis